HMAS ML 827 was a Fairmile B Motor Launch of the Royal Australian Navy.

Fate
While on patrol ML 827 went aground in Jacquinot Bay, New Britain on 17 November 1944. She capsized and sank while under tow on 20 November 1944 off Cape Kawai, New Britain.

References

Further reading
 Evans, Peter (2002) Fairmile Ships of the Royal Australian Navy. Vol 1. 
 Evans, Peter (2002) Fairmile Ships of the Royal Australian Navy. Vol 2. 
 Stevens, D (2005) The Royal Australian Navy in World War II. (2nd edition) 

Ships built in New South Wales
Patrol vessels of the Royal Australian Navy